West Kutai Melalan Airport  is an airport serving Melak, a district in West Kutai Regency, located in the province of East Kalimantan in Indonesia.

Facilities
It has one runway designated 03/21 which measures .

Airlines and destinations

References

Airports in East Kalimantan